Mokbul Hossain was a Pakistani Bengali politician. He was a member of the East Bengal Legislative Assembly from 1954 to 1956.

Biography 
Hossain was born into a Bengali Muslim family in the village of Birdal in Kanaighat, Sylhet District. He participated in the 1954 East Bengal Legislative Assembly election as a United Front candidate. He contested against Moulvi Mubarak Ali of the Muslim League and was elected for the Sylhet Sadar-N constituency. He later moved to Gowainghat.

References 

People of East Pakistan
People from Kanaighat Upazila
20th-century Bengalis

Possibly living people
Year of birth missing